The M114 Command and Reconnaissance Carrier is a Vietnam War-era tracked armored fighting vehicle, used by the United States Army. It was manufactured by the Cadillac Division of General Motors in the early 1960s. The M114 was designed to be fast and stealthy for use in the reconnaissance role.

Like the larger M113, it was amphibious and could be deployed by parachute. However, unlike the M113 which became one of the most successful armoured vehicles, it quickly proved unsuited to use in the Vietnam War, and was replaced in the reconnaissance role by the M551 Sheridan light tank.

By 1979, it had been branded a failure and retired from the US Army, but some were released as surplus and continue to be used by police departments.

Description 
The M114 was a lightweight, low-silhouette vehicle, designed to complement the M113 in command and reconnaissance roles. The M114 was 4 inches lower than the M113, and its upper forward glacis plate had a shallower angle than on the M113, resulting in a somewhat sleeker profile. It was constructed of aluminum and weighed 13,100 lb (5.94 metric tons) empty, with a combat weight of 15,093 lb (6.846 metric tons). It was powered by a Chevrolet V-8 engine with a 283 cubic inch (4.6 liters) displacement. The engine was rated at 160 horsepower. It had a three-man crew, and a top speed of 36 mph (58 km/h). It could swim, propelled by its tracks, and was light enough to be transported by cargo aircraft and dropped by parachute.

In October 1961 the Army awarded General Motors Corporation two contracts totaling $14.9 million for the production of 1,215 T114s. 

The original M114 required the commander's cupola hatch be opened to fire the .50 caliber machine gun, which rotated along with the hatch to allow aim in any direction. The updated M114A1 allowed the firing of the machine gun from the inside, utilizing manual traverse and elevating mechanisms. The M114A2 (aka M114A1E1) had a hydraulically powered cupola and mounted the M139 20mm cannon with greatly improved firepower. The observer in the rear had an M60 7.62mm machine gun mounted on a pedestal. There was stowage on the rear door for three M72A1 "LAW" anti-tank rockets.

Vietnam War 
The Vietnam War became a testing ground for war equipment. Sometimes improvements were made in the United States and sent to Vietnam for testing, but often the projects originated in Vietnam. For example, the ACAV set (Armored Cavalry Assault Vehicle kit for the M113 and M551 Sheridan tank), which successfully met that war's specific needs; and the M114 armored reconnaissance vehicle, which proved inadequate and had to be withdrawn from Vietnam.

The M113 armored personnel carrier introduced in Vietnam in 1962 proved to be highly successful; consequently a similar smaller vehicle, the M114, was introduced in Vietnam the same year. The M113 equipped ARVN (South Vietnamese) mechanized rifle squadrons, while the M114 equipped reconnaissance squadrons; an ARVN reconnaissance squadron consisted of a headquarters troop and three letter (line) troops, each organized with six M114s. Eighty M114s were used to equip four reconnaissance squadrons.

During combat operations in Vietnam, the M114 armored reconnaissance vehicle proved to be mechanically unreliable, underpowered, had extreme difficulty conducting cross country operations, and its lack of resistance to land mines was fatal; a mine that would nearly destroy a standard M113 ACAV would literally blast an M114 reconnaissance vehicle in half. By November 1964, the M114s had been removed from Vietnam and replaced by the dependable M113 ACAV. Unfortunately for the US Army, the combat experience of the M114 in Vietnam was ignored by the high command, and the M114 was issued to all reconnaissance units in Europe, Korea, the United States, etc.; anywhere but in Vietnam. In 1973, Gen. Creighton Abrams branded the M114 a failure and ordered it retired from the US Army. However, on going budget constraints restricted and delayed procurement of sufficient replacement M113s, so use of the M114 continued for several years after 1973 until it could be replaced in all active and reserve units. The 3rd Armored Cavalry Regiment at Fort Bliss, TX was reportedly the last U.S. Army unit to replace their M114s with M113s in late 1979 or early 1980.

Variants 

 T114 Test versions developed in the period 1957-60 with a M40 recoilless rifle, culminating in the prototype of what became the T114 (BAT)
 M114 Production version
 M114A1 – new commander's weapon station allowing firing of the .50-cal machine gun from inside (manually powered cupola), reinforced trim vane
 M114A2 – (1969, initially called M114A1E1) replaced main armament with a Hispano-Suiza HS.820 20 mm gun (designated M139 in U.S. service). Used a hydraulically powered cupola.
 T114 (BAT) - Tank Destroyer variant equipped with an autoloading version of the M40 106mm BAT (Battalion Anti-Tank) recoilless rifle. Only procured in small numbers. Apparently did not enter full series production due to the overall failure of the M114 program.

See also 
 G-numbers (G300)
 List of U.S. military vehicles by model number

References 

 Dunstan, Simon. "Vietnam Tracks-Armor In Battle." 1982 edition; Osprey Publishing; .
 Starry, Donn A., General. "Mounted Combat In Vietnam." Vietnam Studies; First printed 1978-CMH 90-17.

External links 

 Custom M114 test video
 Repaired SWAT M114 checkout
 Restored M114 doing police work.
 M114 command and reconnaissance carrier – Walk around photos
 ACRC M114 at the AFV Database
 Running M114 at the Fort Snelling Military Museum
 The M114, The Armored Jeep / Eaglehorse.org

Cold War armored fighting vehicles of the United States
Armored personnel carriers of the United States
Armoured personnel carriers of the Cold War
Tracked reconnaissance vehicles